Pennanen is a Finnish surname. Notable people with the surname include:

 Pekka Pennanen (1872–1960), Finnish politician
 Martti Pennanen (1923–2010), Finnish film and stage actor
 Petteri Pennanen (born 1990), Finnish football player
 Eetu Pennanen (born 1992), Finnish volleyball player

Finnish-language surnames